Acianthera saurocephala is a species of orchid.

saurocephala